Aspa may refer to:

 Animals (Scientific Procedures) Act 1986, which regulates the use of animals in scientific research in the United Kingdom
 Aspa, Lleida, a village in Catalonia, Spain
 Aspa, Nyköping, a village in Nyköping Municipality, Sweden
 Aspa (river), a river in Russia
 Aspa (gastropod), a genus of gastropods

See also
 ASPA (disambiguation)